Teboho Stephen 'Oupa' Mohojé (born 3 August 1990) is a South African rugby union player for the  in the Pro14 and the  in the Currie Cup. He can play as a flanker or lock.

Career

He then progressed to the Under-21 side, playing for them in 2010 and 2011.

In 2013, he was voted the "Player That Rocks" for the competition.

Representative rugby

In May 2014, Mohojé was one of eight uncapped players that were called up to a Springbok training camp prior to the 2014 mid-year rugby union tests.

In 2016, Mohojé was included in a South Africa 'A' squad that played a two-match series against a touring England Saxons team and was appointed the captain of the team. He was named in the starting line-up for their first match in Bloemfontein, but ended on the losing side as the visitors ran out 32–24 winners. He also started the second match of the series, a 26–29 defeat to the Saxons in George.

Springbok statistics

Test Match Record 

Pld = Games Played, W = Games Won, D = Games Drawn, L = Games Lost, Tri = Tries Scored, Con = Conversions, Pen = Penalties, DG = Drop Goals, Pts = Points Scored

References

South African rugby union players
Living people
1990 births
People from Maluti-a-Phofung Local Municipality
Free State Cheetahs players
Griffons (rugby union) players
Cheetahs (rugby union) players
Rugby union locks
Rugby union flankers
South Africa international rugby union players